Emad El-Din Mohamed Abdel Mena'em Fayed (15 or 17 April 1955 – 31 August 1997), better known as Dodi Fayed, was an Egyptian film producer and the son of billionaire Mohamed Al Fayed. He was the romantic partner of Diana, Princess of Wales, when they both were killed in a car crash in Paris on 31 August 1997.

Early life and education
Fayed was born in Alexandria and was the eldest son of Egyptian billionaire Mohamed Al Fayed, the former owner of Harrods department store. He was the half-brother of Omar Fayed, Camilla, Karim, and Jasmine Fayed. Dodi's father was also the former owner of Fulham Football Club and the Hôtel Ritz Paris. Dodi's mother was Saudi Arabian author Samira Khashoggi, the daughter of Muhammad Khashoggi and sister of Saudi billionaire arms dealer Adnan Khashoggi.

Fayed was a student at Collège Saint Marc before attending the Institut Le Rosey in Switzerland. He also briefly attended Sandhurst. After completing his education, he was an attaché at the United Arab Emirates Embassy in London. He was the first cousin of the late Washington Post Saudi journalist Jamal Khashoggi, who was assassinated in the Saudi Arabian consulate in Istanbul, Turkey, in 2018.

Film production
Through his family's production company, Allied Stars, Fayed was an executive producer of the films Chariots of Fire, Breaking Glass, F/X, F/X2, Hook, and The Scarlet Letter, and an executive creative consultant for F/X: The Series. He also worked for his father on Harrods' marketing.

Personal life 
In 1986, Fayed married model Suzanne Gregard. They divorced eight months later.

According to her memoir Babylon Confidential, Claudia Christian had an on-again, off-again romance with Fayed.

In July 1997, Fayed became romantically involved with Diana, Princess of Wales. Earlier that summer, he was engaged to an American model, Kelly Fisher, and bought a house in Malibu, California, for himself and Fisher with money from his father. Fisher subsequently said Fayed jilted her for Diana and announced that she was filing a breach of contract suit against him, saying he had "led her emotionally all the way up to the altar and abandoned her when they were almost there," and that he "threw her love away in a callous way with no regard for her whatsoever". She dropped the lawsuit shortly after Fayed's death.

Death 

In the early hours of 31 August 1997, Diana and Fayed were killed in a car crash in the Pont de l'Alma underpass in Paris. They had stopped in Paris en route to London after spending nine days on holiday in the French and Italian Rivieras aboard his family's yacht, the Jonikal. Neither was wearing a seat belt. The only survivor of the crash was bodyguard Trevor Rees-Jones, who was seriously injured but remained conscious. Fayed was pronounced dead at the scene on his removal from the wreckage.

Investigations by French and British police concluded that their chauffeur, Henri Paul, was driving under the influence of alcohol and prescription drugs; paparazzi chasing the couple are also believed to have contributed to the accident. Fayed's father, Mohamed Al-Fayed, has said that the couple "were executed by MI6 agents". Fayed's former spokesman, Michael Cole, has said that the couple became engaged before their deaths.

Fayed was originally interred in Brookwood Cemetery near Woking, Surrey, but was re-interred on the grounds of the Fayed estate in Oxted, Surrey in October 1997.

Legacy 

Fayed's father erected two memorials to his son and Diana at Harrods. The first, unveiled on 12 April 1998, consists of photos of them behind a pyramid-shaped display containing a wine glass still smudged with lipstick from Diana's final dinner, and a ring Fayed purchased the day before they died.

The memorials were designed by Bill Mitchell, a close friend of Dodi's father and architect for Harrods for more than 40 years. In January 2018, it was announced that the statue would be returned to the Al-Fayed family.

See also 
 Operation Paget

References

External links 
 

1955 births
1997 deaths
People from Alexandria
Egyptian film producers
El Fayed family
Egyptian diplomats
Egyptian expatriates in the United Kingdom 
20th-century Egyptian businesspeople
Egyptian businesspeople 
English people of Egyptian descent
Egyptian Muslims
Egyptian emigrants to England
Collège Saint Marc, Alexandria alumni
Egyptian people of Saudi Arabian descent
Khashoggi family 
Alumni of Institut Le Rosey
Harrods
Road incident deaths in France
Diana, Princess of Wales
Male lovers of royalty